Maulana Hamdullah Jan Dagai aka Dagai Baba Ji (born; 1909 - 12 January 2019) was a Pakistani Islamic scholar and politician. He was a student of Muhammad Zakariyya al-Kandhlawi and Hussain Ahmad Madani. He was born in 1909 in Dagai, a village in Swabi District. He studied at Darul Uloom Deoband and Mazahirul Uloom Saharanpur. He died on 12 January 2019, at the age of 110.

Education 
He received his early education from his father Allama Abdul Hakim and uncle Maulana Siddique. After that he studied at Darul Uloom Deoband for some time but spent the last three years of his student life in Mazahir Uloom Saharanpur and from there he completed the Hadith studies in 1947.

Political career 
He participated in the 1970 general elections  on the ticket of Jamiat Ulema-e-Islam and the 1988 general elections on the platform of the Islami Jamhoori Ittehad but was unsuccessful.

Death and legacy
Maulana Hamdullah Jan was buried in his ancestral graveyard. Funeral prayers were attended by millions of his students, devotees, leaders of political parties, workers, and citizens.

Successors 
Maulana Hamdullah's son, Ashfaqullah Khan, was made his political successor and superintendent of the madrassa, another son, Dr. Inamullah as deputy successor, the eldest son, Maulana Lutfullah Jan, as Nazim-e-Ala Darul Uloom Mazharul Uloom, while grandson Maulana Asadullah Kaleem was the religious successor. Dastaar Bandi of the successors was done by JUI-F chief Maulana Fazlur Rehman, who arrived at his residence to offer condolences. Maulana Gul Naseeb Khan, provincial Ameer of JUI-F, Mufti Kifayatullah, Maulana Ata-ul-Haq Darwish, Sardar Hussain Babak of ANP, Senator and provincial Ameer of Jamaat-e-Islami Mushtaq Ahmad Khan, Maulana Aziz-ur-Rehman Hazarvi, Senator Maulana Ata-ur-Rehman, and other leaders were also present.

See also
 Mufti Fareed

References 

1914 births
2019 deaths
People from Swabi District
Jamiat Ulema-e-Islam politicians
Darul Uloom Deoband alumni
Pakistani Islamic religious leaders
Mazahir Uloom alumni
Pakistani centenarians
Men centenarians